Heavy Hearted in Doldrums is the debut studio album by American rapper Antwon. It was released on May 6, 2014. It features guest appearances from Lil Ugly Mane, Sad Andy, Wiki, Heems, Lakutis, and Andre Martel. Music videos were created for "Don't Care" and "Metro Nome".

Critical reception

Pat Levy of Consequence of Sound gave the album a grade of B, saying, "There are lyrics on this album that would make Prince or R. Kelly blush, but just moments later, there are lyrics that would make Leonard Cohen shed a tear." Zoe Camp of Pitchfork gave the album a 7.3 out of 10, commenting that "the rapper constructs his boldest collection yet, grounded in improved production and his characteristic schoolboy wit." Nathan Stevens of PopMatters gave the album 6 stars out of 10, stating, "It wouldn't be surprising if this becomes a crossover hit."

On May 9, 2014, Brandon Soderberg of Spin included "Cold Tears" on the "Rap Songs of the Week" list.

Gary Suarez of The Quietus named Heavy Hearted in Doldrums the 15th best hip hop album of 2014. Drew Millard of Vice named it the 8th best album of the year.

Track listing

Personnel
Credits adapted from liner notes.

 Antwon – vocals
 Lil Ugly Mane – vocals (1)
 Shawn Kemp – production (1)
 Cities Aviv – production (2)
 Matrixxman – production (3)
 Sad Andy – vocals (4)
 Suicideyear – production (4)
 Stacy – production (5)
 Tulip Pezley – production (6)
 Walsh – production (7)
 Wiki – vocals (8)
 Lord Pusswhip – production (8)
 Vrong – production (8)
 Heems – vocals (9)
 Lakutis – vocals (9)
 Pictureplane – production (9)
 Dayfade – production (10)
 Ohbliv – production (11)
 Andre Martel – vocals (12)
 Froskees – production (12)
 Lars Stalfors – mixing
 Heba Kadry – mastering
 Scott McPherson – cover art
 Cali Thornhill DeWitt – photography
 CS – layout

References

External links
 

2014 debut albums
Antwon albums